The Frontier region of Posen-West Prussia was a province of Prussia from 1922 to 1938. Posen-West Prussia was established in 1922 as a province of the Free State of Prussia within Weimar Germany, formed from merging three remaining non-contiguous territories of Posen and West Prussia, which had lost the majority of their territory to the Second Polish Republic and Free City of Danzig in the Treaty of Versailles. From 1934, Posen-West Prussia was de facto ruled by Brandenburg until it was dissolved by Nazi Germany, effective 1 October 1938 and its territory divided between the Prussian provinces of Pomerania, Brandenburg and Silesia. Schneidemühl (present-day Piła) was the provincial capital. Today, the province is entirely contained within the modern state of Poland.

Background 

Until the late 18th century partitions of Poland, the lands which made up Posen-West Prussia had been part of the Greater Poland and East Pomeranian (Pomerelian) regions of the Polish–Lithuanian Commonwealth and were administratively parts of the Poznań, Gniezno (Kalisz before 1768) and Pomeranian Voivodeships. Following the First Partition in 1772 the Kingdom of Prussia established the West Prussian province and the Netze District on annexed Pomerelian and Greater Polish (and Kuyavian) territories respectively. The South Prussian province was established following the Second Partition of 1793 and included the remainder of Greater Poland among other territories; the Third Partition in 1795 ended the existence of the Polish state entirely.

In 1807, during the Napoleonic Wars, South Prussia, the Kulmerland (part of West Prussia) and part of the Netze District, along with New Silesia and New East Prussia (excluding the area around Białystok which was ceded to Russia) were ceded to the Napoleonic client Duchy of Warsaw; Danzig was also detached from West Prussia as the Free City of Danzig. The parts of the Netze District which remained within the Kingdom of Prussia were incorporated into West Prussia. After the Napoleonic Wars and the Congress of Vienna in 1815, the Duchy of Warsaw was re-partitioned between the Grand Duchy of Posen under Prussia, the Kingdom of Poland under Russia and the Free City of Cracow (a joint protectorate of Austria, Prussia, and Russia); Danzig returned to West Prussia. The Grand Duchy of Posen was mostly made up of former parts of South Prussia and the Netze District, but also included the Kulmerland which had been part of West Prussia before 1807; the Kulmerland was restored to West Prussia in 1817.

In 1829 West Prussia and East Prussia were merged to form the Province of Prussia, but they were restored in 1878.

Both Posen and West Prussia lay beyond the borders of the German Confederation and Posen was, at least nominally, semi-autonomous. Their population was predominantly Catholic and Polish-speaking, while a sizable Protestant German minority settled mainly in the western parts. Posen lost its semi-autonomous status after the failed Greater Poland Uprising of 1848, becoming the Province of Posen. With Prussia, these provinces became part of the North German Confederation in 1867 and the unified German Empire in 1871. Ethnic tensions were exacerbated by the Germanisation policies of the Berlin government and the anti-Catholic  measures enacted by Chancellor Otto von Bismarck.

History 

Upon the German defeat in World War I, another Greater Poland Uprising broke out in 1918, which aimed to incorporate the lands once annexed by Prussia into a re-established Polish state. The forces of the Polish Military Organisation were able to oust the German administration from the bulk of the Greater Polish lands, whereafter the Posen governor (Landeshauptmann) Ernst von Heyking was forced to retire to Meseritz (Międzyrzecz) and de facto only ruled over the far western, predominantly German settled districts at the border with the adjacent Prussian provinces of Pomerania, Brandenburg and Silesia.

The Polish advance was halted, after the German forces had re-organised in several Freikorps units and the demarcation line became the basis of the ruling by the 1919 Treaty of Versailles, adjudicating the parts occupied by Polish forces uti possidetis to the Second Polish Republic. The governmental power of the German administration was confined to the smaller western parts of Posen and West Prussia, the Prussian state government was represented by the former Bromberg supervisor (Regierungspräsident) Friedrich von Bülow, who relocated his administrative seat to Schneidemühl. With the entry into force of the German Ostmark law on 1 July 1922, the province was created out of those smaller western parts of former Posen and West Prussia that remained with the Weimar Republic.

In view of the previous clashes of arms and the "lost" territories, the remaining German population from the beginning had a strong nationalistic attitude, with the national conservative German National People's Party (DNVP) emerging as the strongest political power in the provincial elections. Friedrich von Bülow, himself a member of the national liberal German People's Party, remained Oberpräsident until his retirement in 1933, whereafter he was succeeded by the Meseritz DNVP politician Hans von Meibom. After the DNVP dissolved in the course of the Nazi Gleichschaltung process, von Meibom was disempowered and replaced by the Nazi Oberpräsident of neighbouring Brandenburg, Wilhelm Kube. Kube, notorious for his corruption, ruled over both provinces until he was deposed after entering into a conflict with the Nazi jurist Walter Buch, father-in-law of mighty Martin Bormann. Posen-West Prussia was further on ruled with Brandenburg under Nazi Oberpräsident Emil Stürtz until it was dissolved in 1938, when its territory was divided between the adjacent provinces of Silesia, Pomerania and Brandenburg.

Subdivision 

Despite the name, the city of Posen, Polish: Poznań, was no longer part of the province, as it had become the capital of the re-established Greater Polish Poznań Voivodeship of the Second Polish Republic. The capital of the Prussian Posen-Westpreußen province and seat of the Oberpräsident supervisor was Schneidemühl. The seat of the province's Landeshauptmann elected by the Landtag assembly remained at Meseritz.

Regierungsbezirk Schneidemühl
former Province of Posen:
Urban district
 Schneidemühl (formerly Bromberg Region)
Rural districts
 Bomst (formerly Posen Region), seat at Bomst (now Babimost)
 Fraustadt (formerly Posen Region), seat at Fraustadt (now Wschowa)
 Meseritz (formerly Posen Region), seat at Meseritz (now Międzyrzecz)
 Netzekreis (formerly parts of the Czarnikau, Filehne and Kolmar districts in Bromberg Region), seat at Schönlanke (now Trzcianka)
 Schwerin an der Warthe (formerly Posen Region), seat at Schwerin an der Warthe (now Skwierzyna)
former West Prussia:
Rural districts
 Deutsch Krone (formerly Marienwerder Region), seat at Deutsch Krone (now Wałcz)
 Flatow (formerly Marienwerder Region), seat at Flatow (now Złotów)
 Schlochau (formerly Marienwerder Region), seat at Schlochau (now Człuchów)

Administration 

The office of an Oberpräsident (i.e. upper president) appointed by the Prussian state government had to carry out central prerogatives on the provincial level and to supervise the implementation of central policy on the lower levels of administration.

As to common interests and tasks to be fulfilled on the provincial level, such as schools, traffic installations, hospitals, cultural institutions, sanitary premises, jails etc., the urban and rural districts (Kreise) within each province (sometimes within each government region) formed a corporation with common assets to these ends, called Provinzialverband (provincial association, or – within government regions or smaller entities – Bezirksverband or Kommunalverband, i.e. municipal or regional association). Since 1875 all provinces had this double identity, being based on central Prussian prerogatives from above, on the one hand, and being bottom-up corporations of province-wide or region-wide self-rule, on the other hand. Initially, the assemblies of the urban and rural districts elected representatives for the provincial diets (Provinziallandtage; or as to regional diets, the so-called Kommunallandtage), which were thus indirectly elected.

After the end of the Prussian monarchy, the provincial or regional diets were all directly elected by the citizens of the provinces (or regions, respectively), with direct elections first held in 1921 and 1922. These parliaments legislated within the competences transferred to the provincial or regional associations. Before the formal establishment of the new Province, the rural and urban district assemblies elected representatives for the Kommunallandtag Posen-West Prussia, legislating within the competences of the former Posen and West Prussia provincial associations and its premises within the territory of the future Posen-West Prussia. After the formal formation of the province, its parliament was called the provincial diet of Posen-West Prussia which elected a provincial executive body (government), the provincial committee (Provinzialausschuss), and a head of province, the Landeshauptmann ("Land Captain").

Oberpräsident
 1922–1933: Friedrich von Bülow, DVP
 1933–1934: Hans von Meibom, DNVP
 1934–1936: Wilhelm Kube, NSDAP (acting), Oberpräsident of Brandenburg
 1936–1938: Emil Stürtz, NSDAP, Oberpräsident of Brandenburg

Landeshauptmann
 1922–1933: Johannes Caspari, SPD
 1933–1938: Hermann Fiebing, NSDAP

Population 
1910: 309,200 (in areas which later became parts of this province)
1919: 326,900
1925: 332,400
1933: 470,600

Polish minority 
After the Treaty of Versailles came into force, some members of the local Polish minority emigrated to Poland. In 1925, 13,284 people declared themselves to be either Polish-speaking or bilingual German/Polish. This corresponded to a population share of 4.3%. The share of the vote of the Polish-Catholic People's Party was stable at around 3% in all state and Reichstag elections in the Weimar Republic. The settlement centers of the Polish minority were unevenly distributed. According to the census of 1925, the districts of Bomst (20.6%), Flatow (16.8%) and Meseritz (5.8%) had the highest proportions of Polish speakers (including bilinguals). A special achievement of the Polish minority was the establishment of a network of Polish private schools.

See also 
Roman Catholic Territorial Prelature of Schneidemühl

References

 
Provinces of Prussia
Former administrative regions of Greater Poland
1922 establishments in Germany
1938 disestablishments in Germany
Former exclaves